Tom Butler is a Canadian television and film actor.

He best known for his television role on the science fiction series Sliders as Michael Mallory, the father of Quinn Mallory in the pilot episode, and reprised his role in the season 2 episode Gillian of the Spirits. Butler appeared in Hostage Rescue Team (TV movie, 2001) as Special Agent David Nelson.

Butler has appeared in a number of films, including Renegades (1989), Ernest Rides Again (1993), First Target (2000), Freddy vs. Jason (2003) and Everything Gone Green (2006).

Butler appeared on such shows as Highlander: The Series, The Commish, The Outer Limits, Stargate SG-1, Smallville, Check It Out!, The Secret Circle, The Killing, and as a recurring character on Gracepoint. In 2013, he starred in 9 seasons of the series «Supernatural», playing Jim Myers.
In 2016, he appeared in Autumn in the Vineyard for the Hallmark Channel.

Filmography

Drying Up the Streets (1978) as Younger Cop
Cementhead (1979)
Murder by Phone (1982) as Detective Tamblyn
Murder in Space (1985) (TV) as Maj. Kurt Steiner
Head Office (1985) as Security Monitor
The Climb (1986) as Willy Merkel
Confidential (1986) as Edmund Eislin
Milk and Honey (1988) as Steven Wineberg
Martha, Ruth and Edie (1988)
Renegades (1989) as Detective Geddles
Scanners II: The New Order (1991) as Doctor Morse
The Diamond Fleece (1992) as Gordon Pritchard
Guilty as Sin (1993) as D.A. Heath
Ernest Rides Again (1993) as Dr. Glencliff
X-Files
 "Colony" (1995) as CIA Agent Ambrose Chapel             
"Ghost in the Machine" (1993) as Benjamin Drake
Red Sun Rising (1994) as Mercenary
Death Match (1994) as Fighter
The Outer Limits (Guest role, episode "Valerie 23", 1995)
Maternal Instincts (1996) as Dr. Milton Shaw
Question of Privilege (1999) as Tate Aldridge
”First Target” (2000) as Senator Jack “JP” Hunter
Life-Size (2000) as Phil
Less Apart (2000) as Lawyer
Josie and the Pussycats (2001) as Agent Kelly
Freddy vs. Jason (2003) as Dr. Campbell
I Accuse (2003) as Warren Hart
Miracle (2004) as Bob Allen
The Score (2005) as JP Martineau
Snakes on a Plane (2006) as Captain Sam McKeon
Everything Gone Green (2006) as Ryan's Dad
Code Name: The Cleaner (2007) as Crane
Shooter (President) (2007) as President
That One Night (2008) as Mr. Wilcox
Crime (2008) as Coach
The A-Team (2010) as Judge Advocate #1
The Killing (2011–2012) (TV) as Mayor Lesley Adams
Primeval: New World (Guest role, 2012, TV) as Drake
Fringe (Guest role, episode "Black Blotter", 2012, TV) as Richard
The Dick Knost Show (2013) as Matt
Supernatural (2014, TV) as Jim Meyers
Primary (2014) as Karl Jaspar
Gracepoint (2014, TV) as Chief Morgan
Fifty Shades of Grey (2015) as WSU University President
Tomorrowland (2015) as Police Captain
Autumn in the Vineyard (2016, TV) as Charles Baldwin
Chesapeake Shores (recurring role, 2016–2018, TV) as Lawrence Riley
Rogue (recurring role, 2017, TV) as Monty Annou
Salvation (recurring role, 2018, TV) as Speaker Barnes
Sonic the Hedgehog (2020) as Vice Chairman Walters
Sonic the Hedgehog 2 (2022) as Vice Chairman Walters

References

External links

Canadian male film actors
Canadian male television actors
Living people
1951 births